Twilight of the Gods is the sixth studio album by Swedish extreme metal band Bathory. It continues the exploration of the newly created Viking metal style, and also displays heavy epic doom and classical influences; it is titled after an opera by Wagner. It is a mid-tempo, more acoustic album than previous Bathory releases, though it follows on from Hammerheart. Of significance is Quorthon's total control of the album, playing all electric and acoustic guitar, keyboards, bass, and drum programming. The background vocals are a particular feature of the album, with Quorthon multi-tracking himself, as he did on Hammerheart, though on this album he sounds more like a chorus than previously. The song "Hammerheart" is based on a melody from Gustav Holst's The Planets; specifically, it is Quorthon's own rearrangement of the middle section of the fourth movement, Jupiter.

Track listing 

The 2003 remastered edition combines tracks 1–3 as one track.

Personnel 
 Quorthon – vocals, guitar, bass guitar, drums, production, engineering, mixing
 Boss Forsberg – production, engineering, mixing

References 

Bathory (band) albums
1991 albums
Viking metal albums
Folk metal albums